The 1949 FIBA European Championship, commonly called FIBA EuroBasket 1949, was the sixth FIBA EuroBasket regional basketball championship, held by FIBA. Seven national teams affiliated with the International Basketball Federation (FIBA) took part in the competition.  The competition was hosted by Egypt after the Soviet Union refused to host it, as was the Soviet's obligation as defending champion under FIBA Europe rules.  Czechoslovakia, the silver medallist at EuroBasket 1947, had been the host that year, so was not asked to repeat hosting duties and those duties fell to bronze medallist Egypt.

The event took place in Cairo, with travel difficulties cited by many nations as the reason for not competing.  Only four of the seven competing teams were European.

Results

The 1949 competition was in the same format as EuroBasket 1939.  Each team played each of the other teams once.  A win was worth 2 standings points, a loss worth 1.  The rankings were based on those standing points.

Results

Final standings

Team rosters
1. Egypt: Youssef Mohammed Abbas, Youssef Kamal Abouaouf, Fouad Abdelmeguid el-Kheir, Gabriel Armand "Gaby" Catafago, Nessim Salah el-Dine, Abdelrahman Hafez Ismail, Hussein Kamel Montasser, Mohammed Ali el-Rashidi, Wahid Chafik Saleh, Mohammed Mahmud Soliman, Albert Fahmy Tadros, Medhat Mohammed Youssef, (Team Captain: Ahmed Hassaan) (Coach: Carmine "Nello" Paratore)

2. France: André Buffière, Robert Busnel, René Chocat, Jacques Dessemme, Maurice Desaymonnet, Louis Devoti, Jacques Favory, Fernand Guillou, Jean Perniceni, Jean-Pierre Salignon, Jean Swidzinski, André Vacheresse, Jacques Freimuller, Marc Quiblier (Coach: Robert Busnel)

3. Greece: Alekos Apostolidis, Stelios Arvanitis, Nikos Bournelos, Thanasis Kostopoulos, Ioannis Lambrou, Faidon Matthaiou, Nikos Nomikos, Missas Pantazopoulos, Nikos Skylakakis, Alekos Spanoudakis, Takis Taliadoros, Sokratis Apostolidis, Nikos Milas (Coach: Georgios Karatzopoulos)

4. Turkey: Hüseyin Öztürk, Samim Gorec, Avram Barokas, Vitali Benazus, Hasim Tankut, Ali Uras, Mehmet Ali Yalım, Tevfik Tankut, Sacit Selduz, Erdogan Partener, Ayduk Koray, Candas Tekeli

External links

FIBA Europe EuroBasket 1949
FIBA article discussing venue
FIBA Europe article on 1940s EuroBaskets
Eurobasket.com 1949 EChampionship

1949
1949 in basketball
E
Sports competitions in Cairo
1949 in Egyptian sport
May 1949 sports events in Africa
1940s in Cairo